The Satyrs Motorcycle Club was founded on November 5, 1954, at the home of Chapin "Smitty" Smith, when, along with seven founding members, the Club held its first official meeting. The club's incarnation had begun a few weeks prior, after a night of drinking, partying, and sex. It is the oldest continuously operating gay organization in the United States, and the first gay organization with a set of bylaws and a club constitution. It did not use the Mattachine Society's "cell structure" developed by Harry Hay to avoid the homosexual/communism witch hunt between 1947 and 1957.

Founding members were: Chapin "Smitty" Smith, Clint "Bud" Olsen, Roy Whitney, Dub Keith, Randy Kinney, Raoul Vasquez and Don Gath. Don Gath is recorded in the minutes of the Oedipus Motorcycle Club of Los Angeles, the second oldest continuously running gay motorcycle club, as their founding member in 1958.

The Satyrs Motorcycle Club helped spawn many motorcycle clubs across the nation in its early years. Many groups "borrowed and copied" the club's bylaws, as they were unsure how to establish themselves after the McCarthyism of the 1950s.

In 2010 the Satyrs Motorcycle Club was inducted into the Leather Hall of Fame.

The Satyrs Motorcycle Club continues to sponsor activities, including the Labor Day Badger Flats Run, which is one of their most well known activities. It also sponsors charity fundraising activities, community involvement, and motorcycle-relevant events.

External links
 Official website

References

1950s in LGBT history
LGBT organizations in the United States
Motorcycle clubs in the United States
1954 establishments in California